Pierre Richard-Willm (3 November 1895 – 12 April 1983) was a French stage and film actor during the 1930s and 1940s.

Biography
Pierre Richard-Willm (originally Alexandre-Pierre Richard) was born in south-western France in the city of Bayonne. He was brought up at first in Barcelona and then, after the death of his mother Elisabeth-Fanny Willm, in Paris.  In 1916 he joined the army, and fought during World War I.

After the war he became a sculptor, and in 1921 he started playing bit roles on stage. In 1924 he took part of in the sculpturing art competition of the Games of the VIII Olympiad, making a group of sculptures on rugby and skating.

In 1925 he was chosen by Ida Rubinstein to appear with her in a stage production of La Dame aux camélias at the Odéon in Paris, and other leading roles at that theatre followed. His film debut came in Toute sa vie (1930, under the direction of Alberto Cavalcanti, and in 1934 he found one of his most successful film roles in Jacques Feyder's Le Grand Jeu. Throughout the 1930s he made several films each year, often appearing as military or aristocratic characters, and he became a very popular star despite feeling sometimes ill at ease with his romantic screen persona.

One of Richard-Willm's frequent co-stars was Edwige Feuillère, and it was with her that he returned to the stage in Paris and on tour in La Dame aux Camélias in 1940/41. He also continued acting in films during World War II, including the role of Edmond Dantes in Le Comte de Monte-Cristo.

In 1946 he decided to give up working in the cinema and he went to the Théâtre du Peuple in Bussang in the Vosges, a theatre with which he had maintained a close connection ever since his first visit there as a teenager in 1911. He became its artistic director from 1946 until 1971 and in numerous new productions he worked extensively on the design of sets and costumes.

In 1975 Richard-Willm published his autobiography under the title Loin des étoiles. He died in Paris, and is buried at the cemetery in Bussang.

Filmography

References

External links
 
 
 Pierre Richard-Willm website

1895 births
1983 deaths
People from Bayonne
French male film actors
20th-century French male actors
20th-century French sculptors
French male sculptors
Olympic competitors in art competitions
 French theatre directors
French military personnel of World War I